Mingora is an administrative subdivision (Tehsil) of Swat District in the Khyber Pakhtunkhwa province of Pakistan.

District Swat has 9 Tehsils i.e. Mingora, Swat, Matta, Swat, Khwaza Khel, Swat, Barikot, Swat, Babuzai Swat, Kabal, Swat, Charbagh Tehsil, Bahrain, Swat and Kalam, Swat. Each Tehsil comprises certain numbers of Union council. There are 65 Union council in district Swat, 56 rural and 09 urban.

See also 

www.mingoraswat.com

References

External links
Khyber-Pakhtunkhwa Government website section on Lower Dir and neighboring places
United Nations
Hajj 2014 Uploads
 PBS paiman.jsi.com

Swat District
Tehsils of Swat District
Populated places in Swat District